Olearia oppositifolia is a species of flowering plant in the family Asteraceae and is endemic to eastern Australia. It is a shrub with egg-shaped to elliptic leaves arranged in opposite pairs, and white and yellow daisy flowers.

Description
Each head has four to six white ray florets and six to eleven yellow disc florets. Flowering occurs from November to January and the achenes are more or less glabrous, the pappus with 44 to 74 bristles.

Taxonomy and naming
This olearia was first formally described in 1860 by Ferdinand von Mueller in Fragmenta phytographiae Australiae and given the name Eurybia oppositifolia. In 1991, Nicholas Lander changed the name to Olearia oppositifolia in the journal Telopea.

Distribution and habitat
Olearia oppositifolia grows in forest and rainforest margins on the ranges between the Border Ranges National Park in south-eastern Queensland and Barrington Tops National Park.

References

oppositifolia
Flora of New South Wales
Flora of Queensland
Plants described in 1860
Taxa named by Ferdinand von Mueller